Guy Mitchell Shuttleworth (6 November 1926 – 21 January 2021) was a cricketer who played first-class cricket for Cambridge University from 1946 to 1948. He was also a football player, and became a teacher.

Life and career
Shuttleworth attended Queen Elizabeth's Grammar School, Blackburn, before going up to King's College, Cambridge. His highest score in first-class cricket was 96 for Cambridge against Sussex in 1948, when he and Doug Insole added 171 for the sixth wicket in two hours. He played for East Lancashire in the Lancashire League from 1944 to 1950 and played eight matches for Lancashire 2nd XI from 1946 to 1948.

Shuttleworth was also a soccer player, winning a Blue at Cambridge and later playing for Corinthian-Casuals F.C. In 1949 he won an amateur international cap for England.

He became a schoolmaster, teaching at St Peter's School, York. The school now awards an annual Guy Shuttleworth Cup for attitude and effort in sport.

Shuttleworth died at the age of 94 on 21 January 2021. He and his wife Tanya had a son and a daughter. One of their grandchildren is the Chelsea and England international footballer Ben Chilwell.

References

External links
 
 Guy Shuttleworth at CricketArchive

1926 births
2021 deaths
People from Blackburn
People educated at Queen Elizabeth's Grammar School, Blackburn
Alumni of King's College, Cambridge
English cricketers
Cambridge University cricketers
Corinthian-Casuals F.C. players
English footballers
Schoolteachers from Lancashire
Association footballers not categorized by position
England amateur international footballers